Mohamed Al-Houti (born 8 September 1972) is an Omani sprinter. He competed in the 200 metres at the 1996 Summer Olympics and the 2000 Summer Olympics.

References

External links
 

1972 births
Living people
Athletes (track and field) at the 1996 Summer Olympics
Athletes (track and field) at the 2000 Summer Olympics
Omani male sprinters
Olympic athletes of Oman
Place of birth missing (living people)
Asian Games medalists in athletics (track and field)
Asian Games bronze medalists for Oman
Athletes (track and field) at the 1998 Asian Games
Athletes (track and field) at the 2002 Asian Games
Medalists at the 1998 Asian Games